Social control is a concept within the disciplines of the social sciences. Social control is described as a certain set of rules and standards in society that keep individuals bound to conventional standards as well as to the use of formalized mechanisms. The disciplinary model was the forerunner to the control model.

History of the term 
The term "social control" was first introduced to sociology by Albion Woodbury Small and George Edgar Vincent in 1894; however, at the time, sociologists only showed sporadic interest in the subject.

Some social philosophers have played a role in the development of social control such as Thomas Hobbes in his work Leviathan that discusses social order and how the state exerts this using civil and military power; as well as Cesare Beccaria's On Crimes and Punishments that argues that people will avoid criminal behavior if their acts result in harsher punishment, stating that changes in punishment will act as a form of social control. Sociologist Émile Durkheim also explored social control in the work The Division of Labour in Society and discusses the paradox of deviance, stating that social control is what makes us abide by laws in the first place.

Society uses certain sanctions to enforce a standard of behavior that is deemed socially acceptable. Individuals and institutions utilize social control to establish social norms and rules, which can be exercised by peers or friends, family, state and religious organizations, schools, and the workplace. The goal of social control is to maintain order in society and ensure conformity in those who are deemed deviant or undesirable in society.

Sociologists identify two basic forms of social control:
 Informal means of control – Internalization of norms and values by a process known as socialization, which is "the process by which an individual, born with behavioral potentialities of enormously wide range, is led to develop actual behavior which is confined to the narrower range of what is acceptable for him by the group standards".<ref>Lindzey, Gardner (Ed), (1954). ':/Handbook of social psychology. I. Theory and method. II. Special fields and applications (2 vols), (pp. II, 655–692). Oxford, England: Addison-Wesley Publishing Co., xx, 1226 pp.</ref>
 Formal means of social control – External sanctions enforced by government to prevent the establishment of chaos or anomie in society. Some theorists, such as Émile Durkheim, refer to this form of control as regulation.

As briefly defined above, the means to enforce social control can be either informal or formal. Sociologist Edward A. Ross argues that belief systems exert a greater control on human behavior than laws imposed by government, no matter what form the beliefs take.

Social control is considered one of the foundations of order within society.

Definition of the concept
Roodenburg identifies the concept of social control as a classical concept.

While the concept of social control has been around since the formation of organized sociology, the meaning has been altered over time. Originally, the concept simply referred to society's ability to regulate itself. However, in the 1930s, the term took on its more modern meaning of an individual's conversion to conformity. Academics began to study Social control theory as a separate field in the early 20th century.

The concept of social control is related to the notion of social order, which is identified as existing in the following areas of society:
The education system
Policing and the law
Psychiatry
Social work
The welfare state
The working environment

The term social control has also been linked to the term delinquency, defined as deviancy, which is the violation of established mores, social norms, and laws.  More serious acts of delinquency are defined as consensus crimes and conflict crimes that are determined by society and the law to inhibit unwanted or negative behavior as a form of social control.

Informal

Social values
Social values are result of an individual internalizing certain norms and values. 
Social values present in individuals are products of informal social control, exercised implicitly by a society through particular customs, norms, and mores. Individuals internalize the values of their society, whether conscious or not of the indoctrination. Traditional society relies mostly on informal social control embedded in its customary culture to socialize its members. The internalization of these values and norms is known as a process called socialization.

Sanctions
Informal sanctions may include shame, ridicule, sarcasm, criticism, and disapproval, which can cause an individual to stray towards the social norms of the society. In extreme cases sanctions may include social discrimination and exclusion. Informal social control usually has more effect on individuals because the social values become internalized, thus becoming an aspect of the individual's personality.

Informal sanctions check "deviant" behavior.  An example of a negative sanction comes from a scene in the film Pink Floyd – The Wall, whereby the young protagonist is ridiculed and verbally abused by a high school teacher for writing poetry in a mathematics class. Another example from the movie About a Boy, when a young boy hesitates to jump from a high springboard and is ridiculed for his fear. Though he eventually jumps, his behavior is controlled by shame.

Reward and punishment

Informal controls reward or punish acceptable or unacceptable behavior (i.e., deviance) and are varied from individual to individual, group to group, and society to society. For example, at a Women's Institute meeting, a disapproving look might convey the message that it is inappropriate to flirt with the minister. In a criminal gang, on the other hand, a stronger sanction applies in the case of someone threatening to inform to the police of illegal activity.

Social control by use of reward is known as positive reinforcement. In society and the laws and regulations implemented by the government tend to focus on punishment or the enforcing negative sanctions to act as a deterrent as means of social control.

Theoretical bias within the modern media
Theorists such as Noam Chomsky have argued that systemic bias exists in the modern media. The marketing, advertising, and public relations industries have thus been said to utilize mass communications to aid the interests of certain political and business elites. Powerful ideological, economic and religious lobbyists have often used school systems and centralized electronic communications to influence public opinion.

Formal

Sanctions
Formal sanctions are usually imposed by the government and organizations in the form of laws to reward or punish behavior. Some formal sanctions include fines and incarceration in order to deter negative behavior. 
Other forms of formal social control can include other sanctions that are more severe depending on the behavior seen as negative such as censorship, expulsion, and limits on political freedom.

Examples of this can be seen in law. If a person breaks a law set forth by the government and is caught, they will have to go to court and depending on the severity, will have to pay fines or face harsher consequences.

According to a study done on crime in cities, in cities that have a higher incarceration rate and those that police make more arrests for public offenses, tend to have lower crime rates and incarceration rates.

Historically
Social control developed together with civilization, as a rational measure against the uncontrollable forces of nature which tribal organisations were at prey to within archaic tribal societies.

Criminal persecutions first emerged around sixth century B.C. as a form of formal social control in Athens, Greece. The purpose of these persecutions were to check certain groups and protect them from malicious interests.

Rulers have used legitimized torture as a means of mind control, as well as murder, imprisonment and exile to remove from public space anyone the state authorities deemed undesirable.

In the Age of Enlightenment, harsh penalties for crimes and civil disobedience were criticized by philosophers such as Cesare Beccaria and Jeremy Bentham, whose work inspired reform movements. These movements eventually led to the Universal Declaration of Human Rights in 1948, which informs most western jurisdictions and the similar Cairo Declaration on Human Rights in Islam in 1990.

The word crime  became part of the vocabulary of the English language via Old French, during the Middle Ages, and within the Middle English phase of the language.

In history, religion provided a moral influence on the community and each person, providing an internal locus of control oriented toward a morality, so that each person was empowered to have a degree of control over themselves within society.
As Auguste Comte instituted sociology (1830-1842), already certain thinkers predicted the discontinuation of a perceived false consciousness intrinsic to religious belief.  Nevertheless, within the twentieth century, social scientists presumed that religion was still a principal factor of social control.

Comte, and those who preceded him, were breathing the air of a revolution in the latter part of the eighteenth century (French Revolution) to bring about a so-called enlightened way of being in society, which brought about a new liberty for the individual, without the constraints of an over-seeing aristocracy.

In the context social control through penal and correctional services, the rehabilitative ideal (Francis Allen 1964) is a key idea that formed within the 20th century—the first principle of which is that behavior is first caused by things that happened before ("Human behaviour is a product of antecedent causes"). The idea was later thought to have less relevancy to the philosophy and exaction or execution of correctional measures, at least according to a 2007 publication (and elsewhere).

Techniques
Law is a technique used for the purposes of social control. For example, there are certain laws regarding appropriate sexual relationships; these are largely based on societal values. Historically, homosexuality has been criminalised in the West. In modern times, due to shifts in societal values, Western societies have mostly decriminalized homosexual relations. However, there are still laws regarding age of consent and incest, as these are still deemed as issues in society that require means of control.

A mechanism of social control occurs through the use of selective incentives. Selective incentives are private goods, which are gifts or services, made available to people depending on whether they do or don't contribute to the good of a group, collective, or the common good. If people do contribute, they are rewarded, if they don't they are punished. Mancur Olson gave rise to the concept in its first instance (c.f. The Logic of Collective Action'').

Oberschall, in his work, identifies three elements to the pragmatics of social control as they exist in our current society. These are, confrontational control, such as  riot control and crowd control, preventative measures to deter non-normal behaviors, which is legislation outlining expected boundaries for behavior,  and measures complementary to preventative measures, which amount to punishment of criminal offences.

Cities can implement park exclusion orders (prohibiting individuals from frequenting some or all of the parks in a city for an extended period due to a previous infraction), trespass laws (privatizing areas generally thought of as public so police can choose which individuals to interrogate), and off-limit orders (Stay Out of Drug Areas (SODA) and Stay Out of Areas of Prostitution (SOAP) that obstruct access to these spaces). These are just a few of the new social control techniques cities use to displace certain individuals to the margins of society. Several common themes are apparent in each of these control mechanisms. The first is the ability to spatially constrain individuals in their own city. Defying any of the above statutes is a criminal offense resulting in possible incarceration. Though not all individuals subjected to an exclusion order obey it, these individuals are, at the very least, spatially hindered through decreased mobility and freedom throughout the city. This spatial constrain on individuals leads to disruption and interference in their lives. Homeless individuals generally frequent parks since the area provides benches for sleeping, public washrooms, occasional public services, and an overall sense of security by being near others in similar conditions. Privatizing areas such as libraries, public transportation systems, college campuses, and commercial establishments that are generally public gives the police permission to remove individuals as they see fit, even if the individual has ethical intent in the space. Off-limit orders attempting to keep drug addicts, prostitutes, and others out of concentrated areas of drug and sex crimes commonly restricts these individuals' ability to seek social services beneficial to rehabilitation, since these services are often located within the SODA and SOAP territories.

Broken windows theory in the United States
In the United States, early societies were able to easily expel individuals deemed undesirable from public space through vagrancy laws and other forms of banishment. In the 1960s and 1970s, however, these exclusion orders were denounced as unconstitutional in America and consequently were rejected by the US Supreme Court. The introduction of broken windows theory in the 1980s transformed the concepts cities used to form policies, to circumvent the previous issue of unconstitutionality. According to the theory, the environment of a particular space signals its health to the public, including to potential vandals. By maintaining an organized environment, individuals are dissuaded from causing disarray in that particular location. However, environments filled with disorder, such as broken windows or graffiti, indicate an inability for the neighborhood to supervise itself, therefore leading to an increase in criminal activity. Instead of focusing on the built environment, policies substantiated by the Broken Windows Theory overwhelmingly emphasize undesirable human behavior as the environmental disorder prompting further crime. The civility laws, originating in the late 1980s and early 1990s, provide an example of the usage of this latter aspect of the Broken Windows Theory as legitimization for discriminating against individuals considered disorderly in order to increase the sense of security in urban spaces. These civility laws effectively criminalize activities considered undesirable, such as sitting or lying on sidewalks, sleeping in parks, urinating or drinking in public, and begging, in an attempt to force the individuals doing these and other activities to relocate to the margins of society. Not surprisingly then, these restrictions disproportionally affect the homeless.

Individuals are deemed undesirable in urban space because they do not fit into social norms, which causes unease for many residents of certain neighborhoods. This fear has been deepened by the Broken Windows Theory and exploited in policies seeking to remove undesirables from visible areas of society. In the post-industrial city, concerned primarily with retail, tourism, and the service sector, the increasing pressure to create the image of a livable and orderly city has no doubt aided in the most recent forms of social control. These new techniques involve even more intense attempts to spatially expel certain individuals from urban space since the police are entrusted with considerably more power to investigate individuals, based on suspicion rather than on definite evidence of illicit actions.

Recent developments
In the decades leading up to the end of the 1980s, an increased prevalence of the individual as a feature within society led to many new therapies, suggesting the use of therapy as a means of social control (Conrad & Scheider, 1980: Mechanic 1989).

See also

References

External links 

 Deflem, Mathieu. 2018. “Social Control.” In The Wiley Blackwell Encyclopedia of Social Theory, edited by Bryan S. Turner. Malden, MA: Wiley-Blackwell.
 Deflem, Mathieu. 2015. "Social Control (Deviance and)." pp. 30–44 in The Handbook of Deviance, edited by Erich Goode. Malden, MA: Wiley Blackwell.
 The Sociology of Social Control - Summary of ideas.
 

Cultural politics
Political science terminology
Surveillance